The following is a list of colubrid snakes of South Asia, primarily covering the region covered by mainland India, Pakistan, Nepal, Sri Lanka, Bangladesh, Bhutan, parts of Myanmar and the Andaman and Nicobar Island chains. This forms part of the complete list of snakes of South Asia.

Family Colubridae
This section is broken into sub-sections based on genera.

Ahaetulla

 Gunther's vine snake Ahaetulla dispar Southwest India
 Green vine snake Ahaetulla nasuta India, Sri Lanka, Nepal, Bangladesh, Myanmar, Thailand, Indo-China
 Oriental green snake Ahaetulla prasina Eastern India, Bangladesh, Bhutan, Myanmar, Indo-China, Malay region
 Brown vine snake Ahaetulla pulverulenta Southwest India, Sri Lanka
 Ahaetulla laudankia, peninsular India

Amphiesma

 Boulenger's keelback Amphiesma parallelum India, Nepal, Myanmar, China, Indo-China
 Eastern striped keelback Amphiesma platyceps India (Kashmir, Northeast), Nepal
 Buff-striped keelback Amphiesma stolatum Pakistan, India, Sri Lanka, Nepal, Bhutan, Bangladesh, China, Indo-China
 Amphiesma khasiense
 Hill Keelback Amphiesma monticola India
 Amphiesma nicobariense
 Amphiesma pealii
 Amphiesma xenura
 Amphiesma modestum
 Amphiesma sieboldii

Argyrogena

 Banded racer Argyrogena fasciolata Pakistan, India, Nepal, Bangladesh

Aspidura

 Boie's rough-sided snake Aspidura brachyorrhos Sri Lanka
 Cope's rough-sided snake Aspidura copei Sri Lanka
 Deraniyagala's rough-sided snake Aspidura deraniyagalae Sri Lanka
 Drummond-Hay's rough-sided snake Aspidura drummondhayi Sri Lanka
 Gunther's rough-sided snake Aspidura guentheri Sri Lanka
 Common rough-sided snake Aspidura trachyprocta Sri Lanka

Atretium

 Olive keelback water snake Atretium schistosum India, Bangladesh, Nepal, Sri Lanka

Balanophis

 Sri Lanka blossom krait Balanophis ceylonensis Sri Lanka

Blythia

 Iridescent snake Blythia reticulata Northeast India, China, Myanmar

Boiga

 Barnes' cat snake Boiga barnesii Sri Lanka
 Sri Lankan cat snake Boiga ceylonensis India, Nepal, Sri Lanka
 Green cat snake Boiga cyanea India, Nepal, Bangladesh, Myanmar, Thailand, Indo-China
 Forsten's cat snake Boiga forsteni India, Nepal, Sri Lanka
 Many-spotted cat snake Boiga multomaculata Bangladesh, Myanmar, Thailand, Indo-China, China
 Orange cat snake Boiga ochracea East and Northeast India, Myanmar
 Common cat snake Boiga trigonata Central Asia, Pakistan, India, Nepal, Bangladesh, Sri Lanka
 Nicobarese cat snake Boiga wallachi India (Nicobars)
 Boiga multifasciata
 Boiga quincunciata
 Boiga ocellata
 Boiga nuchalis
 Boiga gokool
 Boiga dightoni
 Boiga dendrophila
 Boiga cynodon
 Boiga beddomei
 Boiga andamanensis

Calamaria

 Collared Reed Snake Calamaria pavimentata

Cantoria

 Cantor's Water Snake Cantoria violacea

Cerberus

 Dog-faced water snake Cerberus rynchops Pakistan, India, Sri Lanka, Indo-China, Malay region

Cercaspis

 Sri Lankan wolf snake Cercaspis carinatus Sri Lanka

Chrysopelea

 Ornate flying snake Chrysopelea ornata Uzbekistan, Afghanistan, Iran, Pakistan, India
 Sri Lankan flying snake Chrysopelea taprobanica Southwest India, Sri Lanka
 Paradise flying snake Chrysopelea paradisi

Coluber

 Glossy-bellied racer Coluber ventromaculatus India, Sri Lanka
 Coluber rhodorachis
 Coluber karelini
 Coluber gracilis
 Coluber bholanathi
 Coluber vittacaudatus

Coronella

 Indian Smooth Snake Coronella brachyura

Dendralaphis

 Boulenger's bronzebacked tree snake Dendrelaphis bifrenalis Sri Lanka
 Schokar's Bronzeback tree snake Dendrelaphis schokari, Sri Lanka
 Dendrelaphis girii India
 Stripe-tailed bronzebacked tree snake Dendrelaphis caudolineatus India, Sri Lanka
 Blue bronzebacked tree snake  Dendrelaphis cyanochloris India, Bangladesh, Myanmar, Thailand
 Painted bronzebacked tree snake Dendrelaphis pictus Nepal, India, Bangladesh, Myanmar, Thailand, China, Malay region
 Common bronzebacked tree snake Dendrelaphis tristis  Pakistan, India, Nepal, Bangladesh, Sri Lanka
 Dendrelaphis humayuni
 Dendrelaphis grandoculis
 Dendrelaphis gorei

Elachistodon

 Indian egg-eating snake Elachistodon westermanni India, Nepal, Bangladesh

Elaphe

 Yellow-striped trinket snake Elaphe flavolineata India (Andamans), Malay region
 Common trinket snake Elaphe helena Pakistan, India, Nepal, Bangladesh, Sri Lanka
 Himalayan trinket snake Elaphe hodgsonii India (Himalayas), Nepal
 Elaphe mandarina
 Elaphe porphyracea
 Elaphe prasina
 Copperhead trinket snake Elaphe radiata India, Bangladesh, Nepal, Myanmar, Indo-China, China
 Elaphe taeniura

Enhydris

 Dussumier's water snake Enhydris dussumieri India
 Common smooth water snake Enhydris enhydris Nepal, India, Bangladesh, Myanmar, Thailand, Indo-China, Malay region
 Rice Paddy Snake Enhydris plumbea
 Siebold's Water Snake Enhydris sieboldii

Fordonia

 Crab-eating Water Snake Fordonia leucobalia

Gerardia

 Cat-eyed fishing snake Gerardia prevostiana Pakistan, India, Sri Lanka, Myanmar, Malay region

Gongylosoma

 Gongylosoma nicobariensis
 Gonyosoma cantoris
 Gonyosoma frenatum
 Red-tailed Green Ratsnake Gonyosoma oxycephalum

Haplocercus

 Black-spined snake Haplocercus ceylonensis Sri Lanka

Liopeltis

 Lesser stripe-necked snake Liopeltis calamaria Bangladesh, India, Sri Lanka
 Liopeltis rappi
 Liopeltis stoliczkae

Hemorrhois

 Spotted Whip Snake Hemorrhois ravergieri

Homalopsis

 Puff-faced Water Snake Homalopsis buccata

Liopeltis

 Günther's Reed Snake Liopeltis frenatus

Lycodon
 Gunther's bridal snake Lycodo gracilis India, Sri Lanka, False Island (off the Arakan coast of Myanmar)
 Vellore bridal snake Lycodo nympha India, Sri Lanka
 Gammie's wolf snake Lycodon gammiei
 White-banded wolf snake Lycodon septentrionalis
 Banded Wolf Snake Lycodon fasciatus
 Yellow-spotted Wolf Snake Lycodon flavomaculatus
 Laotian Wolf Snake Lycodon laoensis
 Mackinnon's Wolf Snake Lycodon mackinnoni
 Andaman Wolf Snake Lycodon tiwarii
 Zaw's Wolf Snake Lycodon zawi
 Common wolf snake Lycodon aulicus Pakistan, India, Maldives, Nepal, Bangladesh, Sri Lanka, Myanmar
 Andamanese wolf snake Lycodon capucinus India, Myanmar, Thailand, Indo-China, China, Hong Kong
 Yellow-speckled wolf snake Lycodon jara Nepal, India, Bangladesh
 Shaw's wolf snake Lycodon striatus Transcapsia, Afghanistan, Pakistan, India, Sri Lanka
 Travancore wolf snake Lycodon travancoricus India

Lytorhynchus

 Sind Longnose Sand Snake Lytorhynchus paradoxus

Macropisthodon

 Green Keelback Macropisthodon plumbicolor Pakistan, India, Bangladesh, Sri Lanka

Oligodon

 Theobald's Kukri Snake Oligodon theobaldi
 Kukri Snake Oligodon affinis
 White-striped kukri snake Oligodon albocinctus India, Bangladesh, Myanmar
 Common kukri snake Oligodon arnensis Pakistan, India, Nepal, Bangladesh, Sri Lanka
 Templeton's kukri snake Oligodon calamarius Sri Lanka
 Cantor's kukri snake Oligodon cyclurus Bangladesh, Eastern India
 Spot-tailed kukri snake Oligodon dorsalis India, Bangladesh, Myanmar
 Half-lined kukri snake Oligodon sublineatus Sri Lanka
 Variegated kukri snake Oligodon taeniolatus Pakistan, India, Bangladesh, Sri Lanka
 Black-spotted kukri snake Oligodon venustus India
 Nagarkot Kukri Snake Oligodon erythrogaster
 Günther's Kukri Snake Oligodon cinereus
 Assam Kukri Snake Oligodon catenata
 Shorthead Kukri Snake Oligodon brevicauda
 Abor Hills Kukri Snake Oligodon melanozonatus
 Nikhil's Kukri Snake Oligodon nikhili
 Oligodon woodmasoni
 Namsang Kukri Snake Oligodon erythrorhachis
 Walnut Kukri Snake Oligodon juglandifer
 Bluebelly Kukri Snake Oligodon melaneus
 Oligodon templetoni

Pareas

 Assam snail-eater Pareas monticola Bangladesh, India (Himalayan foothills)

Psammodynastes

 Mock viper Psammodynastes pulverulentus India, Myanmar, Thailand, Indo-China, China, Malay region
 Painted Mock Viper  Psammodynastes pictus

Psammophis

 Condanarus sand snake Psammophis condanarus Pakistan, India, Nepal
 Leith's sand snake Psammophis leithii Pakistan, India
 Desert sand snake Psammophis schokari Pakistan, India
 Long Sand Racer Psammophis longifrons

Ptyas

 Doria's Green Snake Ptyas doriae
 Indo-Chinese rat snake Ptyas korros India, China, Myanmar, Malay region
 Indian rat snake Ptyas mucosa Turkestan, Afghanistan, Pakistan, India, Nepal, Bangladesh, Sri Lanka, Myanmar, China, Taiwan, Sumatra, Java
 Black-margined rat snake Ptyas nigromarginata India, China, Myanmar

Pseudoxenodon

 False cobra Pseudoxenodon macrops Bhutan, India, Nepal (Himalayan foothills)

Rhabdops

 Brown Trapezoid Snake Rhabdops bicolor
 Olive Trapezoid Snake Rhabdops olivaceus
 Rhabdops aquaticus

Rhabdophis

 Himalayan keelback Rhabdophis himalayanus India, Bangladesh, Bhutan, Nepal, Myanmar
 Red-necked keelback Rhabdophis subminiatus Nepal, India, Bangladesh, Myanmar, Thailand, China, Indo-China, Malay region

Sibynophis

 Günther's Many-tooth Snake Sibynophis bistrigatus
 Common Many-tooth Snake Sibynophis collaris
 Cantor's blackheaded snake Sibynophis sagittarius Nepal, India, Bangladesh
 Spotted blackheaded snake Sibynophis subpunctatus India, Sri Lanka

Sinonatrix

 Olive Keelback Sinonatrix percarinata

Spalerosophis

 Red-spotted snake Spalerosophis arenarius India, Pakistan
 Royal snake Spalerosophis diadema Turkestan, Iran, Afghanistan, Pakistan, India

Stoliczkia

 Khasi Red Snake Stoliczkia khasiensis

Trachischium

 Blackbelly Worm-eating Snake Trachischium fuscum
 Rosebelly Worm-eating Snake Trachischium guentheri
 Olive Oriental Slender Snake Trachischium laeve
 Mountain Worm-eating Snake Trachischium monticola
 Yellow-bellied Worm-eating Snake Trachischium tenuiceps

Wallaceophis 
 Wallaceophis gujaratensis

Xenochrophis

 Sri Lankan checkered keelback Xenochrophis asperrimus Sri Lanka
 Dark-bellied marsh snake Xenochrophis cerasogaster Pakistan, India, Nepal, Bangladesh
 Andamanese keelback water snake Xenochrophis melanzostus India (Andamans)
 Checkered Keelback Xenochrophis piscator Pakistan, India, Nepal, Bhutan, Bangladesh, Sri Lanka, Myanmar, China, Indo-China
 Yellow-Spotted Keelback Xenochrophis flavipunctatus
 Xenochrophis punctulatus
 St. John's Keelback Xenochrophis sanctijohannis
 Triangle Keelback Xenochrophis trianguligerus

Xylophis

 Perrotet's Mountain Snake Xylophis perroteti
 Günther's Mountain Snake Xylophis stenorhynchus
 Captain's Wood Snake  Xylophis captaini

Notes

References
   & . (2004) Snakes of India: The Field Guide. Draco Books, Chennai. 
  (2002) The Book of Indian Reptiles and Amphibians. Bombay Natural History Society and Oxford University Press.

External links
 Herpetology in South Asia
 Indian snake checklist
 ReptileIndia Yahoo Group

South Asia (colubridae)
South Asia
Snakes
Environment of Pakistan